The Little Duchess is a 1917 American silent drama film directed by Harley Knoles, and starring Madge Evans, Pinna Nesbit, and Jack Drumier. The film was shot at World Film's studios in Fort Lee, New Jersey.

Cast
 Madge Evans as Geraldine Carmichael 
 Pinna Nesbit as Evelyn Carmichael 
 Jack Drumier as Earl of Carinmore 
 J. Gunnis Davis as Jim Dawson 
 Patrick Foy as Jim Snyder 
 Maxine Elliott Hicks as Sophia Dawson 
 James Sheridan as Billy 
 Nellie Anderson as Mrs. Dawson 
 Charles Hartley as Pop Hinkle 
 Richard Clarke as Bradford 
 Harry Bartlett as Hobson 
 Nora Cecil as Orphanage Matron 
 Ivan Dobble as A. Carmichael

References

Bibliography
 Paul C. Spehr. The Movies Begin: Making Movies in New Jersey, 1887-1920. Newark Museum, 1977.

External links
 

1917 films
1917 drama films
1910s English-language films
American silent feature films
Silent American drama films
Films directed by Harley Knoles
American black-and-white films
World Film Company films
Films shot in Fort Lee, New Jersey
1910s American films